Bank of America, National Trust and Savings Association (NT&SA) was the primary bank subsidiary of BankAmerica Corp. A.P. Giannini chose this unusual extension for the bank's name in order to highlight its multiple functions when it converted from a state charter to a national one. The bank was founded as Bank of Italy on October 17, 1904. 

The bank retained the "NT&SA" designation until being renamed to Bank of America, N.A., as part of BankAmerica Corp.'s merger with NationsBank in 1998.

References

Bank of America legacy banks
Companies based in San Francisco
Banks established in 1904
Banks disestablished in 1998
1904 establishments in California